Three vessels of the British Royal Navy have been named HMS Flamborough, after the English town:

  was a 24-gun post ship launched at Chatham Dockyard in 1697 and captured by the French ship Jason near Cape Spartel on 10 October 1705.
  was a 24-gun post ship launched at Woolwich Dockyard on 29 January 1707. It was rebuilt as a 20-gun post ship in 1727 at Portsmouth and sold on 10 January 1748.
  was a 20-gun post ship launched at Limehouse on 14 May 1756 and sold on 23 September 1772.

See also
 
 
 Empire Flamborough, the Empire ship Flamborough

References
 

Royal Navy ship names